Your Sparkling Death Cometh is the fifth studio album and the first album independently released by the American experimental rock group Falling Up on June 28, 2011. The album was first announced on October 22, 2010, The band, having left their long-time record label, BEC Recordings, decided to stay independent and produce the album completely through fundraising. Falling Up's fundraiser for Your Sparkling Death Cometh finished On January 21, 2011, with the total amount received being $13,665, which was $3,665 higher than the original amount needed.

On March 18, 2011, Falling Up announced on their website that the upcoming album would be titled Your Sparkling Death Cometh, which was a significant departure from their previous album titles. As to the meaning behind the album, Falling Up has explained that "Your Sparkling Death Cometh is a title/album/idea that sometimes we all must go through the darkest cave to find the brightest light."

On May 25, 2011, Falling Up released the first single from Your Sparkling Death Cometh, titled "Blue Ghost" on their ReverbNation page. On June 1, 2011, Falling Up released the second single from Your Sparkling Death Cometh, "Diamnds", also on their ReverbNation page. The bonus track, "Darkspeed", was released on June 23, 2011 to everyone who had pre-ordered the full-length album.

The album was released on the scheduled date of June 28, and was available through numerous sources. The physical copy could only be purchased through the band's official website, while the digital copy was made available to iTunes, Amazon.com and Falling Up's BandCamp.

Reception

Your Sparkling Death Cometh generally received very favorable reviews from critics. The album was cited as being exceptionally creative, with a strong focus on originality and composure. Jesus Freak Hideout gave the album five out of five possible stars, as did New Release Tuesday. CM Addict gave it a lower-than-perfect score of 8.5/10, citing that a couple of tracks "are just so-so." ChristianMusicZine.com gave the album a 4.5 out of 5, with reviewer Tyler Hess stating that "it appears so obvious that this is where Falling Up was destined to be, an independent band that has concocted some sort of jambalaya of synthesized indie rock and shoegaze music." IndieVision Music scored the album with nine out of ten possible stars, with author Joshua Clark's only complaint being that the vocals sound repetitive throughout the album.

Track listing
On May 13, 2011 the official track-listing was released on the official site of the band. The track-listing is as follows:

 Circadian - 7:21
 The Wonder - 4:56
 Blue Ghost - 5:06
 Diamonds - 4:18
 The Light Beam Rider - 4:34
 Oceans - 5:58
 Mscron -6:49
 Vates - 5:22
 Forms And Shapes - 5:31
 Slow Waves - 6:41

 Darkspeed (Bonus Track) - 7:01
 The Mountain Machine (Bonus Track - BandCamp Only) - 1:45

Singles

Personnel
 Jessy Ribordy — vocals, guitar, keyboards, composer, lyrics, producer, additional engineering
 Daniel Elder – guitar
 Jeremy Miller — bass, additional engineering
 Josh Shroy — drums, additional engineering, mixing

Additional personnel
 Dan Huttleston – additional electric guitar
Casey Crescenzo – additional electric guitar, engineering, additional production
 Nick Lambert - electric guitars on track 10 and additional piano on track 5
 Jason Weirman and Melissa King - string musicians
 Max Tousseau - additional engineering and assistance
 Brad Blackwood - mastering
 Jesse Penico - design and layout
 Tracked and engineered at Casey Blue Studios, Canyon Lake, CA
 Mixed at The Castle House
 Mastered at Euphonic Masters

References

2011 albums
Falling Up (band) albums
Kickstarter-funded albums